Nanette Makes Everything (German: Nanette macht alles) is a 1926 German silent film directed by Carl Boese and starring Mady Christians, Georg Alexander and Vivian Gibson. It was shot at the Terra Studios in Berlin. The film's sets were designed by the art director Oscar Werndorff.

Cast
Mady Christians as Nanette 
Georg Alexander as Hans Haffner  
Vivian Gibson as Henny, Frau Haffner  
Fritz Kampers as Gustav, Nanettes Braütigam  
Sig Arno as Hugo Klohne, einDamenfreund  
Fritz Spira as Friedrich Westmann, Haffners Chef  
Trude Lehmann as Anna, Köchin

References

External links

Films of the Weimar Republic
Films directed by Carl Boese
German silent feature films
Terra Film films
German black-and-white films
Films shot at Terra Studios